The McDonald's African American Heritage Series is a cassette tape released in 1991 by McDonald's, featuring prominent African-Americans performing readings/songs involving African-American history.

Tracks

Side A: Black Pioneers
 Avery Brooks - Introduction
 Judith Jamison - Katherine Dunham
 Maya Angelou - Langston Hughes
 Melba Moore - Arturo Schomburg
 Patti Austin - Bessie Smith

Side B: Black Rights, Black Justice
 D-NICE - Buffalo Soldiers
 Percy Sutton - Tuskegee Airmen
 Keshia Knight-Pulliam - Daisy Bates
David Dinkins - Politicians of the Reconstruction
 MC Lyte - Underground Railroad
 Avery Brooks - Closing Statement

Credits
Artwork: Saki Mafundikwa
Scriptwriter: Ann Ashwood
Music: Jana Productions, NAJEE & RIZE
Publisher: TRO-LUDLOW MUSIC INC
Produced by Deborah McDuffie
Executive Produced by Marc Strachan

References

McDonald's